Cybaeodamus is a genus of spiders in the family Zodariidae. It was first described in 1938 by Mello-Leitão. , it contains 8 species, all from South America.

Species
Cybaeodamus comprises the following species:
 C. brescoviti Lise, Ott & Rodrigues, 2009 — Brazil
 C. enigmaticus (Mello-Leitão, 1939) — Argentina
 C. lentiginosus (Simon, 1905) — Argentina
 C. lycosoides (Nicolet, 1849) — Peru, Chile
 C. meridionalis Lise, Ott & Rodrigues, 2009 — Brazil, Paraguay, Argentina
 C. ornatus Mello-Leitão, 1938 (type) — Peru, Argentina, Uruguay
 C. taim Lise, Ott & Rodrigues, 2009 — Brazil, Argentina
 C. tocantins Lise, Ott & Rodrigues, 2009 — Brazil

References

Zodariidae
Araneomorphae genera
Spiders of South America